Jeffrey Thomas  (12 November 1933 – 17 May 1989) was a British politician.

Early life
Thomas was educated at Abertillery Grammar School and King's College London, where he was president of the Students Union 1955–56. He was a barrister, called to the bar by Gray's Inn in 1957, and was appointed Queen's Counsel.

Parliamentary career
After being defeated by 1,394 votes at Barry in 1966, Thomas was elected as a Labour Member of Parliament for Abertillery in 1970. In December 1981, he was one of a number of Labour MPs who defected to the new Social Democratic Party.  His seat was abolished by boundary changes in 1983, and he stood that year in Cardiff West.  He came third with 25.5% of the vote, which may have contributed to the victory of the Conservative Stefan Terlezki in a normally strong Labour seat.

He later rejoined the Labour party. He died in Pontypool aged 55.

References 
The Times Guide to the House of Commons, Times Newspapers Ltd, 1983

Thomas, Jeffrey)
1989 deaths
Welsh Labour Party MPs
Social Democratic Party (UK) MPs for Welsh constituencies
UK MPs 1970–1974
UK MPs 1974
UK MPs 1974–1979
UK MPs 1979–1983
Alumni of King's College London
Welsh King's Counsel
20th-century British lawyers
Members of Gray's Inn